Accra College of Education is a teacher education college in Accra (Accra Metro, Greater Accra, Ghana). The college is located in Eastern / Greater Accra zone. It is one of the 46 Public Colleges of Education. The college participated in the DFID-funded T-TEL programme.

As of May 2019, the college is affiliated with the University of Ghana.  The college offers courses such French, Mathematics and Early Childhood Education Studies.

Location 
The college is situated at Legon-Madina in the Greater Accra Region.

History 
The Accra College of Education was formerly called Accra Teacher Training College (ATTRACO). It was formed on September 8, 1909. The college started with 24 students and the first principal was Mr. W. H. Baker. Accra College of Education was opened on 15 November 1962 in a one-storey building at Accra New Town as Government Teacher Training College. The college was founded as a day training college with 19 students and eight members of staff, notable among whom were Messrs Kodjo Haizel and F.N. Gberbie, both of whom became principals of the college. The College was relocated at its present site at East Legon on 10 January 1985. It became a boarding institution in 2001. By 2022, a clinic with a resident nurse had been added to the college's infrastructure.

The College has run the following programmes since its foundation:
 Certificate ‘A’ 4-year Post Middle
 Certificate ‘A’ 2-year Post Secondary
 2-year Modular Post Middle for Pupil Teachers.
 Certificate ‘A’ 3- year Post Secondary (Group One)
 Certificate ‘A’ 3-year Post Secondary (Group Two)
 3-year Diploma in Basic Education.
 Untrained Teachers 4-year Diploma in Basic Education.

Although the college remained the only day teacher training college in the country, until 2001, it performed very well both academically and professionally. It has produced many students who are eminent in several spheres of national life. Many of the past students, tutors of the college have won the best Teacher Awards. In 2007 the college won the Inter Colleges Spelling ‘B’ Competition at the zonal level.

Accra Training College was honored by the visit of the wife of the President of the United States of America, Mrs. Laura Bush and the President of the Republic of Ghana, H.E. John Kufuor to launch a programme to produce reading materials for Basic Schools in 2006. Physical Education students of Accra Training College go through a programme called the ‘Right to Play’ which is an athlete-driven, international humanitarian organization that use play and sports for the development of children, and the youth in areas of the world affected by poverty, sickness and war. The Physical Education department took part in the ‘Nike Fine aside show down’ soccer tournament held at the Trade Fair Centre. The College team qualified to the final round of the competition. The college hosts all the Face-to-Face meetings of students and lecturers of the University of Education, Winneba for the Distance education programme. The current enrolment of students in 2007 was made up of 507 male 300 female students.

Education 
The college has six departments and offers various programmes.

Departments 
 Vocational Skills
 Languages
 Science
 Education Studies
 Mathematics & ICT
 Social Sciences

Programmes offered 
 General Programme
 Early Childhood Education Studies
 Mathematics/Science
 French
 Technical

References 



Colleges of Education in Ghana
Education in Accra
Educational institutions established in 1909
1909 establishments in Gold Coast (British colony)